Ogunlola Omowumi Olubunmi is a Nigerian politician from Ekiti State, Nigeria. She was born on 19 July 1965. She represents Ijero/Ekiti West/Efon Federal Constituency in the House of Representatives.

References

Nigerian women in politics
Members of the House of Representatives (Nigeria)
Yoruba people
Women members of the House of Representatives (Nigeria)
Living people
1965 births
People from Ekiti State